Giuseppe Valle may refer to:

 Giuseppe Valle (water polo)
 Giuseppe Valle (general)